Monte Compatri is a  (municipality) in the Metropolitan City of Rome in the Italian region of Latium, located about  southeast of Rome on the Alban Hills. It is one of the Castelli Romani.

History
Monte Compatri has been identified with the ancient Labicum, a colony of Alba Longa. In the Middle Ages it was a fief of the Counts of Tusculum, then of the Annibaldi, the Altemps and the Borghese.

Main sights
Parish church of Santa Maria Assunta in Cielo (1630–33), erected by will of Scipione Borghese. The campanile is the former communal tower. The façade was designed by Carlo Rainaldi
Palazzo Borghese, the current town hall
 Gabii
 San Silvestro monastery

People
 Marco Mastrofini (1763–1845), philosopher and mathematician
 Cardinal Pompeo Colonna (1479–1530) 
 Alessandro Moreschi (1858–1922) last castrato singer in the Sistine Chapel

Twin cities 

 Calahorra, Spain

References

External links
 Official website
 Centro Culturale Laghetto

Castelli Romani